Giuliano Giannichedda (born 21 September 1974) is an Italian professional football manager, and former footballer who played as a defensive midfielder.

He appeared in 281 Serie A games over the course of twelve seasons (three goals scored), mainly in representation of Udinese and Lazio.

Club career
Born in Pontecorvo, Frosinone, Giannichedda started his senior career with A.S. Sora Calcio 1907 in the fourth division, promoting to the third level at the end of the second of his three years. In the 1995 summer, he moved straight to the Serie A with Udinese Calcio, playing an average of 30 league games during his last four seasons at the Stadio Friuli; in 2000, he won the UEFA Intertoto Cup.

Giannichedda signed with S.S. Lazio for the 2001–02 campaign. He was regularly played as a starter during his four-year spell, winning the 2004 edition of the Coppa Italia.

In 2005 summer, Giannichedda left Rome and joined Juventus FC, where he struggled for playing time under manager Fabio Capello, often being deployed as a substitute along with Manuele Blasi behind starters Emerson and Patrick Vieira. He only made 24 overall appearances in his first year, winning the league title; the team was stripped of the accolade, however, due to the club's involvement in the 2006 Italian football scandal and, as a result, was also relegated.

Giannichedda stayed with Juve for 2006–07, nonetheless. In that season, where the Serie B championship was conquered, he was coached by one of his idols, Didier Deschamps.

Giannichedda retired in June 2008 at nearly 34 years of age, after one unassuming campaign with A.S. Livorno Calcio, featuring in less than a quarter of the matches and suffering top flight relegation.

International career
Giannichedda gained three caps for Italy in 1999, under manager Dino Zoff. His debut came on 31 March, in a 1–1 home draw against Belarus for the UEFA Euro 2000 qualifiers.

Giannichedda also represented the country at under-23 level in the 1997 Mediterranean Games, which were held on home soil, winning the gold medal.

Style of play
An aggressive, hard-working and hard-tackling holding midfielder, who also possessed good technique, Giannichedda was known for his tendency to commit fouls frequently and pick up cards. In addition to his tenacious ball-winning abilities, he was also known for his tactical intelligence, powerful shot and ability to start attacking plays after winning back possession.

Post-retirement
In May 2011, he was awarded a director of football licence and, in July 2013, started acted as assistant to Alberigo Evani at the Italy under-20s team; the following year, he obtained a UEFA Pro Licence.

Giannichedda was appointed as manager for Racing Roma in July 2016. But on 3 April 2017 it was announced by Racing Roma, that Giannichedda suddenly had said to them that he wanted to stop, so the club was forced to fire him. It was a rather strange situation, because he, following the club, didn't say goodbye to anyone but disappeared into the blue.

In July 2018 he was unveiled as new head coach of Serie C club Pro Piacenza. He was fired by Pro Piacenza on 12 November 2018, with the team in relegation zone.

On 27 May 2019, Giannichedda was confirmed as the manager of Serie D club Aprilia. However, after only one month, he left the club by mutual agreement. In July 2019 he was named new head coach of the Italian Lega Nazionale Dilettanti amateur representative teams at Under-19 and Under-18 level.

Honours

Club
Udinese
UEFA Intertoto Cup: 2000

Lazio
Coppa Italia: 2003–04
Supercoppa Italiana: Runner-up 2004

Juventus
Serie B: 2006–07
Supercoppa Italiana: Runner-up 2005

International
Italy
Mediterranean Games: 1997

References

External links

National team data  

1974 births
Living people
People from Pontecorvo
Italian footballers
Association football midfielders
Serie A players
Serie B players
Serie C players
Udinese Calcio players
S.S. Lazio players
Juventus F.C. players
U.S. Livorno 1915 players
Italy under-21 international footballers
Italy international footballers
Italian football managers
Mediterranean Games gold medalists for Italy
Mediterranean Games medalists in football
Competitors at the 1997 Mediterranean Games
Footballers from Lazio
Sportspeople from the Province of Frosinone